Tomorrow It Will Be Better is a 1939 Dutch film directed by Frederic Zelnik.

Cast
Lily Bouwmeester as Willy Verhulst, het schoolmeisje
Paul Steenbergen as Alfred Herder, programmaleider van radio-omroep
Theo Frenkel Jr. as Hans Daldrop
Bob De Lange
Kommer Kleyn	
Aaf Bouber
Chris Baay
Ko Arnoldi
Mien Duymaer van Twist
Louis Gimberg
Guus Weitzel
Joke Bosch

See also
Everything Will Be Better in the Morning (1948)

External links 

Dutch black-and-white films
Films based on Austrian novels
Dutch drama films
1939 drama films
1930s Dutch-language films